Wrzoski  is a district of Opole, Poland, located in the western part of the city.

It has a population of 530.

The name of the district is of Polish origin and comes from the word wrzos, which means "heather".

References

Neighbourhoods in Poland
Opole